Nain (also Romanized as Nāīn & Nāein) is a city and capital of Nain County, Isfahan Province, Iran. At the 2011 census, its population was 25,379 in 7,730 families.

History 
The history of Nain appears to go back to pre-Islamic times, but no information about it has survived. It is famous for its big castle and its congregational mosque, the Jameh Mosque of Nain. It was described by medieval historians to have been in the sardsīr ("cooler highland areas"), and being a subordinate to either Yazd or Isfahan, despite being part of the administration of the Fars Province. The historian and geographer Hamdallah Mustawfi reported that the walls of Nain's castle, which are still present as mud brick remnants, were four thousand paces long. The nearby mountains' silver mines are also described by the geographers. During the Safavid era, the kaolinite of Nain was utilized to manufacture porcelain at the city of Kashan.

Demographics 
The following graph depicts the language composition of the city. Naini is a Central Plateau language which is part of the Northwestern Iranian languages.

References

Sources 
 
 

Populated places in Nain County
Cities in Isfahan Province